Sırrı Acar (born 1943) is a Turkish wrestler. He competed in the 1968 Summer Olympics.

References

External links
 

1943 births
Living people
Wrestlers at the 1968 Summer Olympics
Turkish male sport wrestlers
Olympic wrestlers of Turkey